Sipet College is  located in Meru County, Eastern province, below Mt. Kenya at Ncheege plaza (3rd floor) around Kirukuri street behind consolidated bank.

History 

Sipet College is a private college founded in 1997 on a solid professional and Christian foundation. It has gradually grown from a small computer college to a full college offering courses leading to Certificate and Diploma qualification.

Courses

Today the college has the following courses:

 Certificate in Business Management
 Certificate in Information Technology
 
 Diploma in Business Management
 Diploma in Business Information Technology

Departments
We Have up to five departments
 Department of Computer Science
 Department of Accounts
 Department of Management
 Department of Community development
 Department of languages (French, German)

Current status 
The college has open-learning, e-learning, school-based, part-time and full-time teaching. This has transformed the institution into a leading technical institute in Eastern and Mt. Kenya region. In 1997 it had about 10 students. As of 2011, the number has grown tremendously.

Affiliations
It is an accredited center for:
 Kenya National Examination Council (KNEC)
 Exam Centre for KASNEB
 Alliance Francaise
 Computer Society of Kenya (CSK)
 ACCA- The Association of Chartered Certified Accountants
 International Computer Driving Licence (ICDL)
 Institute of Commercial Management (ICM)(London)
 Association of Business Managers and Administrators (ABMA)(London)
 St Pauls University (Limuru)

Education in Eastern Province (Kenya)
Universities and colleges in Kenya
1997 establishments in Kenya
Educational institutions established in 1997